Trifluoromethyl hypofluorite is an organofluorine compound with the formula .  It exists as a colorless gas at room temperature and is highly toxic.  It is a rare example of a hypofluorite (compound with an O−F bond).  It is prepared by the reaction of fluorine gas with carbon monoxide:
2 F2  +  CO   →  CF3OF

The gas hydrolyzes only slowly at neutral pH.

Use in organic chemistry
The compound is a source of electrophilic fluorine.  It has been used for the preparation of α-fluoroketones from silyl enol ethers.
Behaving like a pseudohalogen, it adds to ethylene to give the ether: 
CF3OF  +  CH2CH2   →   CF3OCH2CH2F

References

Trifluoromethoxy compounds
Fluorinating agents
Hypofluorites